The women's triathlon was part of the Triathlon at the 2014 Asian Games program, was held in Songdo Central Park Triathlon Venue on September 25, 2014.

The race was held over the "international distance" and consisted of  swimming,  road bicycle racing, and  road running.

Schedule
All times are Korea Standard Time (UTC+09:00)

Results

References 

Results

Triathlon at the 2014 Asian Games